"Work" is a song written and performed by Jars of Clay. It is the second radio single from their 2006 studio album Good Monsters. The song was the 13th most played song on U.S. Christian Hit Radio stations in 2007. A live concert version of the song appears on the Live Monsters EP, which was released in 2007. An acoustic version of the song was included as a bonus thirteenth track on Good Monsters when purchased through a pre-release promotion on Apple's iTunes Store. A music video for "Work" was released in 2006.

Track listing
"Work" (Radio Edit) – 3:39 (Dan Haseltine, Charlie Lowell, Stephen Mason, Matt Odmark)

Music video 
The music video for "Work" features the band playing in a small room, where water rises up on the floor. By the end of the video, the whole band is submerged in water.

Awards 

In 2007, "Work" won a Dove Award for Short Form Music Video of the Year at the 38th GMA Dove Awards. It was also nominated for Rock/Contemporary Recorded Song of the Year.

Appearances
This song was also by appearances by the compilation album WOW Hits 2008.

References

External links

Jars of Clay songs
2006 singles
Songs written by Dan Haseltine
Songs written by Charlie Lowell
Songs written by Stephen Mason (musician)
Songs written by Matt Odmark
2006 songs
Essential Records (Christian) singles